National People's Assembly may refer to:
 National People's Assembly of Guinea-Bissau, the unicameral legislative body of Guinea-Bissau
 National People's Assembly of Thailand, an citizens' assembly in Thailand concerned with electing members of the Constitution Drafting Assembly
 People's National Assembly, the lower house of the Algerian parliament

See also 
 National Assembly, a legislature or house of a bicameral legislature in some countries
 People's Assembly (disambiguation)